Osubi Airstrip  is an aviation facility located in Osubi, within  Okpe Local Government,  serving the city of  Effurun, Warri and its environs in Delta State, Nigeria.

Osubi is a town in Okpe Local Government Area of Delta state, Southern Nigeria.

The runway length does not include a  displaced threshold/overrun on each end, making the total paved length . The Osubi non-directional beacon (Ident: OS) is located on the field.

Airstrip
Prior to construction of the airport, a small airstrip had been created next to a congested part of the city of Warri during the 1960s. There was a small terminal building and an aircraft hangar. Small charter aircraft of Aero Contractors and other firms provided service to and from Lagos airport and other Nigerian cities.

Construction of the airport

The federal government first drew up plans to build an airport here in the late 1970s to allow easy transport into Warri by air because of its status as an oil city, but the plan languished for over two decades. Meanwhile, people coming in and out of Warri continued to use the old airstrip in a congested part of the city. The airstrip could only accommodate small aircraft on its short runway, so that whenever a plane took off or landed, the authorities had to close off an adjacent road to traffic so that a passing car would not be clipped.

Finding it harder and harder to conduct business with the old airstrip, Shell decided to build one on its own. The airport was commissioned and open for commercial use on 1 April 1999 with Shell (SPDC) landing a modern Dornier 328 and Aero Contractors 50-passenger Dash aircraft at the Osubi airport. Since the airstrip opened for public use, it is reckoned to be one of the busiest aviation facilities in Nigeria and it is being operated in partnership with other oil companies.

The maintenance and facilities are among the best in the country and traffic flow is one of the highest. In the first six months of the opening of Osubi Airstrip, more than 100,000 passengers passed through just as it handled 3,500 aircraft movements.

The Delta State government is making plans with the airstrip operator Shell in upgrading and building a longer second runway of  due to the increase in air traffic.

Airlines and destinations

Statistics 
These data show number of passengers movements into the airport, according to the Federal Airports Authority of Nigeria's Aviation Sector Summary Reports.

See also
Transport in Nigeria
List of airports in Nigeria
List of the busiest airports in Africa

References

External links 
 Osubi Airstrip at Delta State web site
OurAirports - Warri
SkyVector Aeronautical Charts
OpenStreetMap - Warri

Airports in Nigeria
Delta State